Lo niego todo ("I deny everything") is Joaquín Sabina's 17th studio album, born out of a collaboration among Sabina himself, singer-songwriter Leiva, who serves as producer of the album, and novelist Benjamin Prado.

Track listing

Credited musicians
 Guitars: Carlos Raya, Ariel Rot
 Bass: Iván González 'Chapo'
 Drums: Jose 'El Niño' Bruno
 Keyboards: César Pop, Joserra Senperena

Charts

Weekly charts

Year-end charts

Certifications

References

2017 albums
Joaquín Sabina albums